Francis "Frank" Vincent Chisari (born 5 April 1942 in New York City) is a physician, experimental pathologist, virologist, and immunologist, known for his research on virus-host interactions of hepatitis B and hepatitis C.

Education and career
Chisari graduated in 1963 with a bachelor's degree in biology from Fordham University and in 1968 with an M.D. from Cornell University's Weill Medical College. He was in 1970 and 1971 a fellow in anatomic pathology at the Mayo Clinic and in 1972 a staff associate in immunopathology at the NIH's Laboratory of Pathology. In 1973 he completed his residency in internal medicine at Dartmouth Medical School. At Scripps Research he became a research fellow, then an assistant professor from 1975 to 1981, an associate professor from 1981 to 1988, and a full professor from 1988 to 2015, retiring as professor emeritus in 2015. At Scripps Research he headed the Division of Experimental Pathology from 1988 to 2008 and the Laboratory of Experimental Virology from 2008 to 2015. From 1983 to 1984 he was a Fogarty Scholar in molecular biology at the Institut Pasteur. He is now a scientific advisor for Ionis Pharmaceuticals and for Vir Biotechnology.

Chisari studies the immunological basis for viral clearance and disease pathogenesis during persistent viral infections, especially HBV and HCV, the signaling pathways and effector molecules that mediate these antiviral effects, and the viral evasion strategies that subvert them. He is most well known for demonstrating that chronic immune-mediated injury and inflammation can cause liver cancer and for discovering that antiviral T cells can purge viruses from infected cells noncytolytically by secreting antiviral cytokines that inhibit viral replication, thus controlling the infection while preserving the vital functions of the infected tissue.

Chisari's laboratory developed cell-based models and animal models of HBV and HCV infection and performed foundational studies elucidating the T-cell response to these viruses in infected humans, subhuman primates, and transgenic mice. His group discovered that cytotoxic T lymphocytes (CTL) secrete antiviral cytokiness that inhibit viral replication in the liver cell without killing the cell, thus controlling the infection while preserving the life-saving function of the liver, a new paradigm in hepatitis B virus immunobiology. His research has informed novel immunotherapeutic approaches for the treatment of (chronic) hepatitis, via vaccination that triggers the production of antiviral cytokine-producing T cells and via the activation of dendritic cells.

Chisari's laboratory first demonstrated that HCV RNA can be transmitted via exosomes from infected hepatocytes to uninfected hepatocytes while masked from detection by anti-HCV antibodies, identifying a unique mechanism for viral spread by escaping recognition by the immune response while in transit. They also demonstrated that exosomes released by infected cells can deliver HCV RNA to (nonpermissive) plasmacytoid dendritic cells, triggering an innate host response that was shown by many groups to exert a profound antiviral impact on viral spread, illustrating the existence of an elegant balance between virus and host mediated by HCV RNA-containing exosomes, a new paradigm in hepatitis C virus immunobiology.

Chisari has served on the editorial boards of many scientific journals, including the American Journal of Pathology, Hematology, the Journal of Clinical Investigation, the Journal of Immunology, the Journal of Virology, PLoS Pathogens, Virology, and Current Opinion in Virology. He is the inventor or co-inventor for many patents on various peptides for treating or preventing viral infections caused by hepatitis-B or hepatitis-C.

Awards and honors
 1992 – Member of the Association of American Physicians
 1996 — Fellow of the American Association for the Advancement of Science
 1997 — Ernst Jung Prize
 1999 — Rous-Whipple Award of the American Society for Investigative Pathology
 1999 — Distinguished Achievement Award of the American Association for the Study of Liver Diseases
 2002 – Fellow of the American Academy of Microbiology
 2002 — Member of the National Academy of Sciences
 2003 — Member of the National Academy of Medicine

Selected publications

 Cited in PMC
 Free full text Cited in PMC

References

 

American virologists
American immunologists
20th-century American physicians
21st-century American physicians
Fordham University alumni
Weill Cornell Medical College alumni
Scripps Research faculty
Members of the National Academy of Medicine
Members of the United States National Academy of Sciences
Fellows of the American Association for the Advancement of Science
1942 births
Living people
Fellows of the American Academy of Microbiology